Live at Montreux 2011 is a live release by English hard rock band Deep Purple's mk VIII lineup credited as Deep Purple with Orchestra, and performed alongside the Neue Philharmonie Frankfurt conducted by Stephen Bentley-Klein. This concert was recorded at the Montreux Jazz Festival on 16 July 2011. Besides a 2CD release, the concert film has also been released on DVD and Blu-ray. All formats were released on 7 November 2011 by German label Eagle Rock Entertainment. In 2015 a vinyl collector's edition of the album was released for a Record Store Day.

Track listing
All songs written by Ritchie Blackmore, Ian Gillan, Roger Glover, Jon Lord, and Ian Paice except where noted.

2CD track listing

Disc 1 
 "Deep Purple Overture" (Stephen Bentley-Klein, Jack Bruce, Pete Brown, Eric Clapton, Blackmore, Gillan, Glover, Lord, Paice) – 1:39
 "Highway Star" – 6:54
 "Hard Lovin' Man" – 6:08
 "Maybe I'm a Leo" – 4:30
 "Strange Kind of Woman" – 6:19
 "Rapture of the Deep" (Gillan, Steve Morse, Roger Glover, Don Airey, Paice) – 5:44
 "Woman from Tokyo" – 6:18
 "Contact Lost" (Morse) – 4:28
 "When a Blind Man Cries" – 3:50
 "The Well Dressed Guitar" (Morse) – 2:42

Disc 2 
"Knocking at Your Back Door" (Blackmore, Gillan, Glover) – 6:07
"Lazy" – 8:45
"No One Came" – 5:40
"Keyboards Solo" (Airey) – 5:45
"Perfect Strangers" (Gillan, Blackmore, Glover) – 6:05
"Space Truckin'" – 4:55
"Smoke on the Water" – 8:32
"Green Onions" (Steve Cropper, Al Jackson, Lewie Steinberg, Booker T. Jones)/Hush (Joe South)/Bass solo" (Glover) – 8:18
"Black Night" – 7:10

DVD/Blu Ray 
 "Deep Purple Overture/Highway Star"
 "Hard Lovin' Man"
 "Maybe I'm a Leo"
 "Strange Kind of Woman"
 "Rapture of the Deep"
 "Woman from Tokyo"
 "Contact Lost"
 "When a Blind Man Cries"
 "The Well-Dressed Guitar"
 "Knocking at Your Back Door"
 "Lazy"
 "No One Came"
 "Don Airey Keyboard Solo"
 "Perfect Strangers"
 "Space Truckin'"
 "Smoke on the Water"
 "Hush" (South)
 "Black Night"

Bonus Feature
 Interview with Deep Purple

Personnel
Deep Purple
Ian Gillan – vocals, harmonica
Steve Morse – guitar, backing vocals on "Hush"
Roger Glover – bass
Ian Paice – drums
Don Airey – keyboards

with
Neue Philharmonie Frankfurt
Stephen Bentley-Klein – conductor

Production notes
Live sound mixed and recorded by David Richards at Mountain Studios, in Le Voyageur I
Audio mixed by Julie Gardner at Jam Studios, London
Audio mastered by Mazen Murad at Metropolitan Studios, London

Chart performance

See also
Live at Montreux 1996
Live at Montreux 2006

Deep Purple live albums
Deep Purple video albums
Live video albums
2011 video albums
2011 live albums
Albums recorded at the Montreux Jazz Festival